Northridge High School may refer to:

Northridge High School (Alabama) — Tuscaloosa, Alabama
Northridge High School (Colorado)  — Greeley, Colorado
Northridge High School (Indiana) — Middlebury, Indiana
Northridge High School (Dayton, Ohio)
Northridge High School (Johnstown, Ohio)
Northridge High School (Layton, Utah)
Northridge Academy High School — Los Angeles, California